USS PC-1179 was a  built for the United States Navy during World War II. She was later renamed Morris (PC-1179) but never saw active service under that name.

Career
PC-1179 was commissioned in 1944 and decommissioned in 1946, she was renamed as the eighth USS Morris in 1956.

She was struck from the navy register on 1 July 1960 and sold on 10 May 1961, to Zidell Shipbreakers in Portland, Oregon for $17,038.88.

References

External links
USS Morris 

PC-461-class submarine chasers
Ships built in Sturgeon Bay, Wisconsin
1943 ships
World War II patrol vessels of the United States